Xestia quieta is a moth of the family Noctuidae. It is known from northern Scandinavia, northern Siberia and northern North America (including Nunavut, the Northwest Territories, Yukon and Manitoba).

The wingspan is 25–29 mm. Adults are on wing in June and July in Sweden.

The larvae possibly feed on Empetrum species.

Subspecies
Xestia quieta quieta
Xestia quieta constricta (Walker, 1857)

References

Xestia
Moths of Europe
Moths of Asia
Moths of North America